Perdita Constance Huston (May 2, 1936 – December 4, 2001) was an American journalist and women's rights activist. She is commemorated by the international Perdita Huston Human Rights Award.

Born in Portland, Maine, Huston studied in France and later worked in Africa. She was director of public affairs for TIME magazine in French-speaking countries, and in 1978 became a Regional Director of the Peace Corps. Her first book "Message from the Village" was also published in 1978.

She later worked for the World Conservation Union (IUCN) in Switzerland and at the International Planned Parenthood Federation (IPPF) in London and acted as consultant with UNDP, UNIFEM, UNFPA and UNICEF. From 1997, she returned to work for the Peace Corps as a Country Director in Mali and then Bulgaria.

The Perdita Huston Human Rights Award is supported by the Washington D.C. chapter of the United Nations Association of the United States of America. 
The awardees include 
2003 - Sima Samar
2004 - Madame Fatumata Traore
2005 - Ms. Ranjana Gaur
2006 - Sunitha Krishnan
2007 - Zipporah Sein, Bishnu Pariyar, and Samar Minallah
2011- Zainab Salbi

Books
 Message from the Village, Epoch B Foundation, 1978 
 Third World Women Speak Out, Praeger Publishers, 1979 ASIN B000GWIA8Q
 The Right to Choose, Earthscan Publications, 1992 
 Motherhood by Choice: Pioneers in Women's Health and Family Planning, The Feminist Press 1992 
 Families As We Are, The Feminist Press, 2001  - see also

Further reading
 Biography - Huston, Perdita Constance (1936-2001) - A digital article from: Contemporary Authors, Thomson Gale, 2006

Notes

External links
 
 Archived papers, Maine Women Writers Collection, University of New England

1936 births
2001 deaths
American women journalists
American women's rights activists
20th-century American women